Situated along the Pee Dee River, Pee Dee National Wildlife Refuge contains  in Anson and Richmond Counties, North Carolina. The refuge was established to provide wintering habitat for migratory waterfowl. The refuge was established in October 1963 to provide habitat for geese and other waterfowl. 

Cooperative farming in field impoundments, water level management, and the bottomland hardwood forest along Brown Creek provide excellent habitat for waterfowl and other wildlife. Wintering waterfowl numbers fluctuate greatly, but can exceed 10,000 birds yearly. The refuge also supports a small population of wintering Southern James Bay Canada geese. Local numbers of wintering migratory geese have dwindled in recent years, but the refuge remains an important wintering area for the remaining geese and thousands of ducks. Pee Dee Refuge is a few hundred yards from the private Lockhart Gaddy Wild Goose Refuge. In the 1950s, Gaddy's pond wintered more than 10,000 Canada geese a year.

The refuge also supports an abundance of nesting neotropical migratory birds, bobwhite quail, wild turkey, raccoon, bobcat, opossum and white-tailed deer. The diversity of habitat and management provides for more than 168 bird species, 49 reptiles and amphibians, 28 mammals, and 20 fish species. Refuge lands include the following habitat types: bottomland hardwood forest, upland pine forest, mixed pine/hardwood forest, crop lands, old fields, native warm season grasslands, and openings.

References
Refuge website

National Wildlife Refuges in North Carolina
Protected areas of Anson County, North Carolina
Protected areas of Richmond County, North Carolina
Protected areas established in 1963
Yadkin-Pee Dee River Basin